A baseline is a line that is a base for measurement or for construction.

The word baseline may refer to:
 Baseline (configuration management), the process of managing change
 Baseline (sea), the starting point for delimiting a coastal state's maritime zones
 Baselines of the Chinese territorial sea
 Baselines of Indonesia
 Baselines of the Philippines
 Baseline, in underwater diving, a value used to convert cylinder pressure of a tank to free gas volume
 Baseline (surveying), a line between two points of the earth's surface and the direction and distance between them
 Baseline (typography), the line upon which most letters "sit" and below which descenders extend
 Baseline (budgeting), an estimate of budget expected during a fiscal year
 Baseline (medicine), information found at the beginning of a study
 Baseline (pharmacology), a person's state of mind or being, in the absence of drugs
 The isoelectric line of an electrocardiogram
 Baseline (interferometry), the length of an astronomical interferometer

The name Baseline may refer to:
 Baseline (magazine), a magazine devoted to typography, book arts, graphic design
 Baseline (database), a TV and movie industry database
 Baselines (album), the 1983 debut album of composer Bill Laswell
 Baseline Road (Arizona), a major east–west artery in Phoenix, Arizona
 Baseline Road (Colorado), a major east–west artery in Boulder, Colorado
 Baseline Road (Ottawa), a major east–west artery in Ottawa, Ontario
 Baseline station, a transitway station in Ottawa
 Base Line, Arkansas
 Baseline Nunataks
 Baseline Rock

It may also refer to:
 The base line in baseball
 The back line on a tennis court, and also a style of play in tennis; see tennis strategy
 The back line on a pickleball court
 The end line on a basketball court
 A bassline in music
 A shifting baseline in statistics
 Baseline Killer, a serial killer who was active in the Phoenix metro area between August 2005 and June 2006

See also 
 Baseline Road (disambiguation)